Babar Hussain (born 23 September 1984) is a Pakistani first-class cricketer who plays for Karachi Whites.

References

External links
 

1984 births
Living people
Pakistani cricketers
Karachi Whites cricketers
Cricketers from Karachi